The Rhaetian Railway, abbreviated RhB, is a Swiss transport company that owns the largest network of all private railway operators in Switzerland. Headquartered in Chur, the RhB operates all the railway lines of the Swiss canton of Grisons, except for the line from Sargans to the cantonal capital, Chur, which are operated by Swiss Federal Railways (SBB CFF FFS), as well as the line from Disentis/Mustér to the Oberalp Pass and further on to Andermatt, Uri, which is operated by Matterhorn Gotthard Bahn (MGB). Inaugurated in 1888 and expanded from 1896 onwards in various sections, the RhB network is located almost entirely within Grisons, with one station across the Italian border at Tirano.

The Rhaetian Railway serves a number of major tourist destinations, such as St. Moritz and Davos.

In 2008, the RhB section from the Albula/Bernina area (the part from Thusis to Tirano, including St. Moritz) was added to the list of UNESCO World Heritage Sites. The Albula-Bernina line is the first rail line in the world to be photographed and put on Google Street View. The line also operates several historic trains on the network.

History

The establishment of the Rhaetian Railway traces back to Dutch , who owned a hotel in Davos. He proposed a railway line from Landquart to Davos in 1888. Holsboer founded the Landquart-Davos AG to begin construction of a standard-gauge line, but the mountainous terrain lacked sufficient space. On 29 June 1888, a ground-breaking ceremony took place for a narrow-gauge railway instead. By 1890, the railway line served Davos.

In 1895, Holsboer changed his company's name to the Rhaetian Railway to reflect his plans for network expansion. By 1896 the lines Chur–Landquart and Chur–Thusis were operated. In 1897, a referendum was held for the Rhaetian Railway to bid on operations of the Graubünden/Grisons State Railways.

This was followed by the Albula line in 1903 and the series of expansion projects carried on until 1922. In 1903 the Album line reached Celerina, and in 1904 also St.Moritz was able to be served. During the years 1907 to 1910, the Rhaetian Railway, in collaboration with the federal and cantonal governments, undertook a large-scale expansion of its network.

  (the Bernina Railway from St Moritz to Tirano) is electrified at 1000 V DC.
  is electrified at 11 kV 16.7 Hz (including since 1997 Chur-Arosa and the new Vereina tunnel).

The network contains 84 tunnels (the longest being the  Vereina Tunnel, opened on 19 November 1999, and the  Albula Tunnel) and 383 bridges. The maximum gradient is 7% on the Bernina railway, 6% on the Chur–Arosa line and 4.5% on Landquart–Davos line.

In 2022, to celebrate the 175th anniversary of Switzerland's first railway, the Rhaetische Bahn, supported by Swiss train-builder Stadler, came together to run the world's longest-ever passenger train, composed of 100 cars stretching almost two kilometres long.

Network

Current passenger services as operated by the RhB (2016):

In 2002 the annual traffic carried by the RhB was 300 million passenger-kilometres and 54 million tonne-kilometres of freight. 80% of the passenger income comes from tourist traffic, although 40% of passengers are local commuters.

Landquart–Davos line

Landquart railway station in Graubünden is the starting point of the Rhaetian Railway, historically as part of the Landquart-Davos line, operationally as the company's main workshop, and topologically as the 0 kilometre point of the company's core network.  The Landquart-Davos line is the oldest in the Rhaetian Railway network.

After leaving Landquart, the line to Davos generally follows the river Landquart upstream as far as Klosters Platz. Along the way, it crosses the river three times and passes by the award-winning Sunniberg Bridge, the centerpiece of the Klosters bypass road.

Just south of Klosters Platz, the tracks cross the river the last time and come to two tunnels. One of these is for the Vereina line (see below). The other, the Klosters loop tunnel, takes the Davos line  through a 90-degree loop towards the west.  The line to Davos begins to climb at 4.5% gradient and then loops 180 degrees back towards the east, inside the Cavadürli loop tunnel. It continues to climb through dense larch and other coniferous forests to the Davos Laret.

Then the line leads back down and along Lake Davos to Davos Dorf, and the terminus at Davos Platz.

Davos–Filisur line

The connecting line from Davos Platz to the Albula Railway at Filisur passes through wild gorges, and is technically very interesting, not only due to its famous Wiesen Viaduct.

It was electrified in 1919.

Landquart–Thusis line

Starting in the Rhine valley, the Landquart-Thusis line runs more or less parallel with the Swiss Federal Railways' Sargans-Landquart-Chur standard gauge line as far as Chur.  The line to Thusis then simply follows the course of the Rhine to Bonaduz. From there, it enters the Domleschg Valley and follows the Posterior Rhine from Rhäzüns to Thusis.

Albula line  (Thusis–St. Moritz) 

This line begins in Thusis (697 m).  It continues toward Tiefencastel (851 m) following the Albula and then crosses the Landwasser Viaduct before arriving at Filisur (1032 m). Shortly after Filisur the line passes its first spiral tunnel then continues to Bergün/Bravuogn (1373 m).

Between Bergün/Bravuogn and Preda (1789 m), at the end of the valley, the line has to achieve a difference in height of about 400 metres inside a horizontal distance of 5 kilometres, without using rack-and-pinion, but with many spirals. Then the line enters the Albula Tunnel at 1,815 metres under the Albula Pass. It emerges in the Val Bever, where it reaches Bever (1,708 m) on the Engadin plain. The line continues toward Samedan (1,721 m) and arrives at St. Moritz (1,775 m).

Albula tunnel

In 2009 it was announced that an examination of the Albula Tunnel conducted in 2006 had found major degradation of the tunnel, with over 60% of the lining in need of replacement. Furthermore, the bores are small by modern standards, and cabling, signalling and drainage all need replacement. As a result, it was announced that an inquiry would decide between two options for action: a comprehensive renewal of the existing tunnel, or the construction of a new bore to modern standards. As a result of this inquiry, RhB decided to build a new tunnel. Construction began in 2015, with the new tunnel opening in 2022 and the project completed including refurbishment of the old tunnel in 2023.

Reichenau–Disentis/Mustér line

The Reichenau to Disentis/Mustér line links the rest of the Rhaetian Railway network with the Matterhorn Gotthard Bahn.  It branches from the line to Thusis behind the shared Rhine bridge.

The line, which was opened progressively between 1903 and 1912, has been electrified since 1922.

In contrast with the accompanying road, which rises about 500 metres towards Flims and Laax, the railway to Disentis/Mustér runs slowly up the narrow "Ruinaulta gorge". On this part of the line, its associated engineering structures dominate the otherwise pristine natural landscape.

At Ilanz, the railway line and road merge paths once again.  Their combined pathways then rise slowly and evenly to Disentis/Mustér.

The main traffic on the Reichenau–Disentis/Mustér line is RegioExpress passenger trains operating at hourly intervals.  Several times a day, there are Glacier Express trains in each direction.

Timetabled goods trains also operate on the line to serve industry in the Vorderrhein area and supplied cement for the construction of the normal gauge Gotthard Base Tunnel with train IDs starting with 5. Usually three pairs of trains serve Disentis/Mustér with a Ge 6/6 II and a few additional trains go only to Ilanz with a Ge 4/4 II.

Engadin line (Pontresina–Scuol-Tarasp)

This line, which runs up the Engadin valley, was constructed in two stages. The Samedan–Pontresina section was opened on by the Rhaetian Railway on 1 July 1908, simultaneously with the Pontresina–Morteratsch section, which formed part of the then-independent Bernina Railway. The actual Engadine line, between Bever and Scuol-Tarasp, was opened on 1 July 1913, and was the first Rhaetian Railway line to be electrified from the start at 11 kV 16⅔ Hz AC.

Since the opening of the Engadin line, Pontresina has been a dual system station, as the Bernina Railway operates on 1,000 V DC.  Track 3 at Pontresina station has a switchable catenary, and is used for trains, such as the Heidi Express, operating through the station and needing to change from one of the two electification systems to the other.

Between Samedan and Bever, the Engadin line shares its track with the Albula Railway.  With the opening of the Vereina Tunnel and line in November 1999, the Engadin line, at both Lavin (Sagliains car shuttle train station) and Susch (Sasslatsch II car shuttle train station), acquired a direct connection to the Prättigau at Klosters, on the Landquart–Davos line.

Bernina line (St. Moritz–Tirano, originally Berninabahn)

This line begins at St.Moritz and runs towards Pontresina (1,774 m) in Val Bernina. It ascends progressively through the valley to the Bernina Pass over the Morteratsch station (1,896 m) (with the Morteratsch Glacier and Piz Bernina, the highest summit of the Eastern Alps, in sight). After Morteratsch, the line runs towards Bernina Diavolezza (2,093 m), where an aerial tramway leads to Diavolezza, and Ospizio Bernina station. This station, next to Lago Bianco, stands at the line's summit at 2,253 m above sea and holds the title of the highest point of the entire Rhetian Railway network and among all adhesion railways in Europe.

Alp Grüm (2,091 m) is the first station to the immediate south of the summit. It is situated above Lago Palü and right below Piz Palü and Palü Glacier. After negotiating many hairpin turns, the line reaches Cavaglia (1,693 m) above Val Poschiavo; after that, the line descends across the valley towards the Swiss Italian-speaking town of Poschiavo (1,014 m).

After Poschiavo, the line runs next to Lago Poschiavo and calls at Le Prese (964 m) and Miralago (965 m). The descent continues towards Brusio (780 m), after which the line runs across the famous spiral bridge, Brusio Viaduct. After the spiral bridge, the line passes through the Swiss border town of Campocologno (553 m) before entering Italy at Tirano RhB station (430 m).

Arosa line (originally Chur–Arosa-Bahn (ChA))

Work began in 1912 on the route and the line opened on 12 December 1914. The railway leads up from Chur to Arosa (a total climb of ) via a number of tunnels, bridges and other structures, including the Langwieser Viaduct - a structure of national importance. In 1942 the line became part of the RhB company and network; however the line ran on a separate electric system to the remainder of the network until 1997. Before then it was 2400 V DC - now it is 11 kV 16.7 Hz AC. The gauge has always been  as per the rest of the RhB network.

It is a single track railway, with the exception of a short double track section along Engadinstrasse in Chur, with a number of passing loops along the route: at all stations with the exception of Chur Stadt (and formerly Sassal), as well as at Chur Sand depot and at Haspelgrube near Arosa. The maximum incline is 6% but there is no rack-and-pinion used.

A short section of the line runs along the streets of Chur and is known as the Chur  ('town railway'). In Chur, the line starts on Bahnhofplatz, in front of the main railway station, where that station's platforms for the Arosabahn are, though there is a second stop in Chur only 760 metres from the main station.

A 5-kilometre tunnel through the Mittenberg had been planned as an alternative route for the lower section of the line, avoiding running through the centre of Chur. This plan was finally dropped in 1996 as the considerable expense could not be justified.

Currently the train service (Regio) R4 provides the passenger service on the line and is shown as timetable 930 in the Swiss national timetables. It is well used by tourists coming to and from the resort at Arosa. The line also carries a substantial amount of freight.

Bellinzona–Mesocco line (originally Ferrovia Bellinzona–Mesocco)

This line is not connected to the others. It opened in 1907 and was owned by the Rhaetian Railway between 1942 and 2003. Passenger services ceased in 1972, but a limited freight traffic continued until 2003. The road construction had been started in July 2014.

Vereina line

Rolling stock

Apart from the normal passenger coaches and the panoramic coaches used for the branded Bernina Express tourist services, the railway attaches to the back of trains, according to need:
 yellow open trucks with wooden benches called 
 art deco Pullman coach AS 1143, which may be hired by private parties

Corporate information

Statistics
 Travellers per year (2008): 10.7 million
 Revenue (2008): 308,700,000 sFr.
 Profit (2008): 1,700,000 sFr.
 Employees (2008): 1,348
 Total rolling stock (2008): 1,294

Ownership
The RhB is 51.3% owned by the Cantonal government of Graubünden, 43.1% by the Swiss Confederation, 4.6% by private shareholders and 1% by a collection of local communities.

The RhB has its headquarters at Bahnhofstrasse 25, Chur.

Accidents and incidents

On 13 August 2014, a passenger train was struck by a landslide and derailed at Tiefencastel, Graubünden, on the Albula Railway. Eleven people were injured.

In popular culture
In 1997, the Rhaetian Railway was used as the prototype for the Nord Express in the 20th Century Fox animated motion picture Anastasia. Not only was the Rhaetian Railway featured in the film, but several landmarks were also included: the Landwasser Viaduct and a 1912 Mittelthurgau-Bahn Ec 3/5 Class 2-6-2 tank locomotive No. 3 with an added tender. This 1912 locomotive was portrayed as a Russian continental steam locomotive (fictional). It was modified with the smoke deflectors and the smoke-box door from a Danish State Railways Class R 963. The locomotive's fictitious number being used in the movie was 2747, as this was a reference to the address of the Fox Animation Studios on East Camelback Road in Phoenix, Arizona. The Landwasser Viaduct was portrayed as a tall, 4-storey viaduct in Poland as a type of Roman aqueducts.

See also
 Bernina Express
 Hakone Tozan Railway: Japanese private mountain railway, twinning railway with RhB.
 List of mountain railways in Switzerland
 List of heritage railways and funiculars in Switzerland
 List of narrow-gauge railways in Switzerland
 List of railway companies in Switzerland
 Table of turn tunnels

Notes and references

Bibliography

External links

 RhB official website (English)
 The Rhaetian Network Image presentations of famous Rhaetian lines
 Rail-info.ch description
 Railfaneurope.net, RhB photos

 
World Heritage Sites in Italy
World Heritage Sites in Switzerland
Railway companies of Switzerland
Transport in Graubünden
Transport in Lombardy
Metre gauge railways in Switzerland
Railway companies established in 1888
Swiss companies established in 1888
Heritage railways in Switzerland